"Neo Universe/Finale" is the twentieth single by L'Arc-en-Ciel, released on January 19, 2000. It debuted at number 1 on the Oricon chart and sold over one million copies, as certified by the RIAJ. "Finale" was used as the theme song of Ring 0: Birthday. The third track is an instrumental and the fourth is a remix version of the song "Trick" from their 1999 album Ray.

Track listing

* Remix by Yukihiro.

References

2000 singles
L'Arc-en-Ciel songs
Oricon Weekly number-one singles
Songs written by Hyde (musician)
Songs written by Ken (musician)
Songs written by Tetsuya (musician)
Ki/oon Music singles